Members of the Legislative Assembly of Samoa were elected on 31 March 2006. It consisted of 49 representatives, elected from six two-seat and 35 single-seat territorial constituencies, and two non-territorial constituencies.

As of May 2009, there were four woman MPs, but one, Fuimaono Na'oia Te'i, was expelled by the Speaker at the end of May, due to changing her party membership.

The parliamentary session was officially opened by the O le Ao o le Malo, Malietoa Tanumafili II, on 30 May 2006.

Members

Initial MPs

New members

Summary of changes
 On 6 April 2006, three independent MPs, Solamalemalo Keneti Sio, Muagututagata Peter Ah Him, and Lafaitele Patrick Leiataualesa joined the HRPP, increasing its seat count to 35 seats.<ref> Vaisigano # 1 constituency wants newly elected MP to join HRPP camp, EventPolynesia.com, 6 April 2006.</ref>
 Pa’u Sefo Pa’u's election in the Fa'asalele'aga No. 2 seat was overturned by a court petition on 2 August 2006.  His daughter Letoa Rita Pa’u Chang was elected in a by-election for the seat on 25 September 2006.
 Mulitalo Sealiimalietoa Siafausa Vui's election was overturned by a court petition on 16 August 2006. The subsequent by-election for the Fa'asalele'aga No. 4 was won by Vui Tupe Ioane on 11 October 2006.
 Paepae Kapeli Sua's election was overturned by a court petition on 16 August 2006.  The subsequent by-election was won by Muagututia Siaosi S Meredith on 11 October 2006.
 On 15 November 2006, following the departure of former leader Le Mamea Ropati and senior MP Sililoto Tolo Tuaifaiva, the Samoan Democratic United Party fell below the eight MPs required to be recognised as a party, and all its members have subsequently been treated as independents.
 Letoa Rita Pa’u Chang's election was overturned by a court petition on 4 December 2006. The subsequent by-election was won by Papalii Samuelu Petaia on 2 February 2007.
 Manuleleua Lalagofaatasi Falaniko Leleua died on 14 February 2007.  The resulting by-election was won by Patauave Etuale on 23 April 2007.
 Sililoto Tolo Tua'ifaiva died on 9 March 2007.  The subsequent by-election for the Vaimauga West seat was won by Patu Ativalu on 8 May 2007.
 On 14 March 2008, Muagututi' a Siaosi Meredith and Palusalue Fa’apo II resigned from the HRPP and became independent MPs.
 On 27 April 2008, twelve independent MPs including most of the former members of the Samoan Democratic United Party and two former members of the Human Rights Protection Party announced the formation of a new political party. Despite having sufficient MPs, the new party would not be recognised in the House. The party became the Tautua Samoa Party, ultimately with nine Members in Parliament. In May 2009, Speaker Tolofuaivalelei Falemoe Lei'ataua revoked the parliamentary membership of all nine of the party's MPs, on the grounds that joining a part after'' being elected "breached the provisions of the Electoral Act and the parliament standing orders". Their expulsion from Parliament would prompt by-elections. Party chairman Lealailepule Rimoni Aiafi stated that he would seek an interim injunction against the Speaker's ruling.
 On 18 March 2010, Lealailepule Rimoni Aiafi, Palusalue Fa’apo II and Va'ai Papu Vailupe refused to deny they supported the Tautua Samoa Party, and as a result were deemed to have resigned their seats and new anti-party-hopping laws. By-elections for the three seats were held on 14 May 2010, resulting in Fa’apo and Vailupe being re-elected.  Lealailepule Rimoni Aiafi lost his seat to HRPP candidate Ale Vena Ale.
 On 2 September 2010 Satupa'itea MP Asiata Sale'imoa Va'ai died.

References

External links
 14th Parliament 2006 – 2011: Members of Parliament & Ministers

 2006